Joseph Patrick Hurley (January 21, 1894 – October 30, 1967) was an American prelate of the Roman Catholic Church. He served as bishop of the Diocese of St. Augustine in Florida from 1940 until his death in 1967. 

He was awarded the personal title of archbishop in 1949.

Biography

Early life 
Joseph Hurley was born on January 21, 1894, in Cleveland, Ohio, one of nine children of Michael and Anna (née Durkin) Hurley. His parents were both Irish immigrants; Michael was from County Mayo, and Anna from Sligo. Hurley received his early education at Holy Name School from 1901 to 1909, and then attended St. Ignatius High School in Cleveland until 1912. He was the only one among his siblings to continue his education past age 16. Hurley applied to the US Military Academy at West Point, nominated by U.S. Representative Robert J. Bulkley.  However, the nomination was disallowed when it was discovered Hurley was not a resident of Bulkley's 21st congressional district.

Hurley attended John Carroll University in Cleveland from 1912 to 1915. At John Carroll, he was president of the College Debating Society and the speaker at the commencement ceremony. He also played football for the Geiger Clothes Company team, earning the nickname "The Breezer." Hurley began his studies for the priesthood at St. Bernard's Seminary in Rochester, New York, and was assigned to further theological studies at St. Mary's Seminary in Cleveland in 1917. During his summer vacations at St. Mary's, he worked as a naval observer in Sandusky, Ohio.

Priesthood 
On May 29, 1919, Hurley was ordained a priest for the Diocese of Cleveland by Bishop John Farrelly at the Cathedral of St. John the Evangelist in Cleveland. His first assignment was as an assistant pastor at St. Columba's Parish in Youngstown, Ohio, where he remained for four years. In 1923, he received an interim assignment to St. Philomena's Parish in East Cleveland, Ohio. Later that year, Hurley was appointed to a pastoral posting at Immaculate Conception Parish in Cleveland.

In 1927, Hurley accepted an offer to serve as secretary to Archbishop Edward Mooney, his former professor at St. Mary's Seminary and now apostolic delegate to India. He accompanied Mooney in 1944 to Japan when Mooney was transferred to the apostolic delegation there. Following Mooney's return to the United States as bishop of Rochester, Hurley remained in Japan to serve as chargé d'affaires of the apostolic delegation  from 1933 to 1934. During this period, he helped resolve a conflict that arose between Japan and Canada after the newspapers in Kagoshima, Japan, accused Canadian Catholic missionaries of conducting spying operations on the fortified islands off Kagoshima Bay.

Hurley was named a domestic prelate by Pope Pius XI in 1934. That same year, he became the first American to serve as an official of the Vatican Secretariat of State. During his work at the Secretariat of State, he acted as a liaison between the Holy See and the American Catholic hierarchy. He played an influential role in shaping the Vatican's policy towards Father Charles Coughlin, a controversial Michigan priest and radio personality.

Bishop of St. Augustine 
On August 16, 1940, Hurley was appointed the sixth bishop of the Diocese of St. Augustine by Pope Pius XII. Some believed that his appointment was made to allow Hurley to remain in contact with the ailing Myron Charles Taylor, the American emissary to the Vatican. Others believed the appointment was a punishment; Hurley had become a critic of the wartime policy of the Vatican, believing Pope Pius XII was overly fearful about communism and not fearful enough about Nazism. 

Hurley received his episcopal consecration on October 6, 1940, from Cardinal Luigi Maglione, with Archbishops Celso Costantini and Clemente Micara serving as co-consecrators, at the chapel of the Pontifical Urbaniana University in Rome. Returning to the United States, Hurley was installed as bishop of St. Augustine on November 26, 1940.

Opposition to Nazism 
Before the Japanese attack on Pearl Harbor in World War II, Hurley was considered the most outspoken interventionist among the American Catholic bishops. He made enemies among isolationist Catholic clergy and laity by labeling the Nazi Party "public enemy No. 1" of the United States and the Catholic Church. He declared, "The foe of all we love, both as Americans and as Catholics, is the Nazi. Communism is still our enemy but ... in point of urgency if not in point of teaching, communism has now ceded its primacy to national socialism."During World War II, Hurley aligned himself with the U.S. Department of State and began to act under the direction of government officials. His efforts were largely composed of black propaganda, the use of false source attributions. In a radio address in July 1941, he expressed his belief that President Franklin D. Roosevelt alone should decide upon U.S. entry into the war, saying, "It is up to him to safeguard the interests of the nation in times of great emergency. ...The problem [of entering the war] should be left to the Commander-in-Chief, who alone ... is capable of bringing us safely through." These remarks drew sharp criticism from Archbishop Francis Beckman, who subsequently denounced the "dictatorship pseudo-officially canonized by a brother cleric."  

In an editorial in his diocesan newspaper in 1943, Hurley became the only Catholic bishop to demand Catholics to speak out against the extermination of the Jews taking place in the Nazi concentration camps, claiming that "the very basis of the Roman Catholic faith" compelled Catholics to challenge the "orgies of extermination" being perpetrated against the Jews.Hurley described the 1943 Allied bombing of Rome as a "tragically mistaken decision," and predicted that "much of our national unity, much of the respect we enjoy abroad now lie with San Lorenzo, in ruins." He also opposed the idea that the United States should ally with Germany to oppose the Soviet Union.

Service in Yugoslavia 
In 1945, in addition to his role as bishop, Hurley was appointed by Pius XII as regent ad interim to Yugoslavia. He thus became the first American to be raised to the equivalent rank of a nuncio. Relations between the Vatican and Yugoslavia had been deteriorating following the end of the war; the new communist government had been accused of murdering priests and had accused the Catholic Church of "obstructionist" activity. During his five years in Yugoslavia, Hurley negotiated with Marshal Josip Tito and worked closely with U.S. officials. In 1946, he represented Pius XII at the show trial of Archbishop Aloysius Stepinac in Yugoslavia by Tito for "crimes against the people." However, his relationship with Pius XII became strained after Hurley expressed his opposition to both the Vatican's policy towards Tito and to the removal of Archbishop Stepinac from his post in Croatia.

Return to St. Augustine 
In 1949, Hurley was relieved of his diplomatic post in Yugoslavia, and was given the personal title of archbishop on August 14, 1949. Between 1962 and 1965, Hurley attended all four sessions of the Second Vatican Council in Rome  In Florida, according to one retired priest, Hurley would fly around the state and locate property where the several new interstate highways were being planned. Hurley would buy up properties near the highways to establish future parishes. 

Hurley was a staunch opponent of the American Civil Rights actions during the 1960s, even avoiding Martin Luther King Jr. at the airport when their paths crossed unexpectedly. King would eventually write Hurley a letter requesting his support for the movement—though to no avail.

Hurley became ill while attending the Synod of Bishops in Rome, and returned to Florida for treatment. After being nominated on July 1, 1966, he served on the St. Augustine Restoration and Preservation Commission. 

Joseph Hurley died at Mercy Medical Center in Orlando, Florida, on October 30, 1967, at age 73.

References

References
Gallagher, Charles R. 2008. Vatican Secret Diplomacy: Joseph P. Hurley and Pope Pius XII. New Haven and London: Yale University Press.

External links
Archdiocese of Omaha

1894 births
1967 deaths
Religious leaders from Cleveland
Roman Catholic Diocese of Cleveland
Roman Catholic bishops of Saint Augustine
20th-century Roman Catholic bishops in the United States
Participants in the Second Vatican Council
John Carroll University alumni